The R315 road is a regional road in County Mayo in Ireland.

The government legislation that defines the R315, the Roads Act 1993 (Classification of Regional Roads) Order 2012 (Statutory Instrument 54 of 2012), provides the following official description:

Pontoon — Crossmolina — Ballycastle, County Mayo

Between its junction with R310 at Pontoon and its junction with N59 at Main Street Crossmolina via Terrybaun, Lahardaun, Ballybrinoge; and Mullenmore Street at Crossmolina all in the county of Mayo

and

between its junction with N59 at Erris Street Crossmolina and its junction with R314 at Ballycastle via Church Street at Crossmolina; Stonehall, Moygownagh and Ballinglen all in the county of Mayo.

See also
 List of roads of County Mayo
 National primary road
 National secondary road
 Regional road
 Roads in Ireland

References

Regional roads in the Republic of Ireland
Roads in County Mayo